Gani Zhailauov (born 3 August 1985) is an amateur boxer from Kazakhstan who fought at lightweight (-60 kg) at the 2012 Olympics.

At the 2011 World Amateur Boxing Championships he won Bronze, after losing the semifinal to Cuban Yasniel Toledo. He hereby qualified for the Olympics.

At London he had major problems in a 12:12 countback win over Saylom Ardee who complained bitterly, then defeated Jai Bhagwan 16:8.  In the quarter-finals, he again lost to Toledo.

References 

1985 births
Living people
People from Kyzylorda Region
Lightweight boxers
Boxers at the 2012 Summer Olympics
Olympic boxers of Kazakhstan
Kazakhstani male boxers
AIBA World Boxing Championships medalists